Eyvallah (Turkish phrase with Arabic origin similar to Okay), is Turkish-Cypriot pop music singer Işın Karaca's ninth studio album, released digitally on 1 December 2017. She released "Az Bi Mesafe" in June 2014 as a single. After this single she made a Turkish classical music project, Ey Aşkın Güzel Kızı.

The second single from the album, "Güzelim" (Turkish: I'm beautiful or My beauty), a cover version of "Maghroum" by Yara, was released on 10 June 2016. The music video premiered on 4 July 2016, directed by Mustafa Özen.

The third single, "Sevmekten Anladığım" (Turkish: What I understand from love), which was a duet with Sefa Chesmeberah, was released on 20 January 2017. On 11 July 2017, she released "Çakma", the fourth single from the album. The fifth single "Bize De Bu Yakışır" is released with the release of the album.

Track listing

References:

References

Işın Karaca albums
2017 albums